Sebastian Rohrberg (born 13 March 1979) is a German recurve archer. He has competed at the major World Archery Federation competitions, the World Cup and the World Archery Championships, winning gold medals at the indoor and field championships. The highest world ranking he has achieved is 31.

References

German male archers
Living people
1979 births
Competitors at the 2005 World Games
Competitors at the 2009 World Games
World Games bronze medalists
World Games medalists in archery
Competitors at the 2017 World Games